Events from the year 1850 in Sweden

Incumbents
 Monarch – Oscar I

Events
 19 June – The wedding between Crown Prince Charles and Louise of the Netherlands.
 30 July - First issue of Hallandsposten.
 - Eriksbergs Mekaniska Verkstad is founded. 
 - The Church of Jesus Christ of Latter-day Saints in Sweden is established in Sweden.
 - The harpist Pauline Åhman becomes the first female instrumentalist employed at the Royal Swedish Chapel orchestra Kungliga Hovkapellet.

Births
 17 February  – Ann-Margret Holmgren, author, feminist and pacifist  (died 1940) 
 6 March – Victoria Benedictsson, writer (died 1888) 
 23 April - Agda Montelius, philanthropist and women's rights activist (died 1920) 
 12 November - Calla Curman, host of a literary salon (died 1935)

Deaths

 15 February – Elisabeth Forsselius, actress   (born 1771)
 13 May – Erik Jansson, leader of a Swedish pietist sect that emigrated to the United States in 1846 (born 1808) 
 - Anna Carlström, innkeeper and brothel madam  (born 1780)

References

External links

 
Years of the 19th century in Sweden
Sweden